Spasmolytic is a single by the band Skinny Puppy from the album Too Dark Park. Deftones created a remix of the song that was included on Remix dystemper and the Saw IV soundtrack. At a running time of 31:22, "Spasmolytic" is Skinny Puppy's longest 12-inch single.

The cover art is by Jim Cummins (I, Braineater).

The track "Harsh Stone White", when performed live, featured a backing video that, like the infamous Worlock video, consisted of frightening and graphic scenes from movies. These include The Hunger, Blue Velvet, Day of the Dead, The Thing, Pumpkinhead, 2001: A Space Odyssey, Drugstore Cowboy, The Texas Chainsaw Massacre 2, Dead Ringers, Altered States, Evil Dead II, Brain Damage, Parents, The Fly II, The Cabinet of Dr. Caligari, Galaxy of Terror, and The Serpent and the Rainbow.

Track listing

Notes
 Track 5, "Choralone (Live in Houston)", is only listed on the disc itself. Additionally, it is not featured on all CDs.

Personnel
All credits adapted from liner notes.

Skinny Puppy
Nivek Ogre – vocals
cEvin Key – synthesizers, programming, engineering, production
Dwayne Goettel – synthesizers, programming, engineering, production

Additional personnel
Dave Ogilvie – production, mixing (2–5)
Anthony Valcic – editing
Ken Marshall – engineering
Greg Reely – mixing (2)
Jim Cummins – artwork
John Rummen – typography

References

1991 singles
Skinny Puppy songs
1990 songs
Capitol Records singles
Songs written by cEvin Key
Songs written by Dwayne Goettel
Songs written by Dave Ogilvie